United Sports Club Slavia is a multi-sports club from Sofia, Bulgaria, founded in 1913. It has sections for football, ice hockey and basketball.

Departments
 HC Slavia Sofia, ice hockey team
 PFC Slavia Sofia, football team
 WBC Slavia Sofia, women's basketball team

References

External links

 
Multi-sport clubs in Bulgaria